An anti-record is a musical vinyl record which has been treated (melted, drilled, painted, etc.) so that it becomes a noise record. While this term was first used by Laylah Records on conventional vinyl releases by Current 93, Nurse with Wound, and others, Ron Lessard of RRRecords applied the term to a series of physically altered records released by RRR in 1988. Anti-records can also be records featuring strange configurations or pressing, such as extra or unusually sized holes, locked grooves, and parallel grooves. One notable noise anti-record was Pagan Muzak, created by noise artist Boyd Rice, which contained locked grooves as well as multiple center holes. RRRecords also published a record containing 500 locked grooves by various artists.

External links
A Brief history of Conceptual and Anti-Records. 
A video of an Anti-Record.

Audio storage